Makenzie "Kenie" Wright (born August 14, 1997) is an American former soccer player who played as a midfielder for NJ/NY Gotham FC in the National Women's Soccer League.

Career

High school
Born and raised in Mount Laurel, New Jersey, Wright attended Lenape High School.

Professional
Wright was drafted by Sky Blue FC in the 4th round of the 2019 NWSL College Draft.

References

External links
Rutgers Scarlet Knights bio

1997 births
Living people
American women's soccer players
Lenape High School alumni
Soccer players from New Jersey
Rutgers Scarlet Knights women's soccer players
NJ/NY Gotham FC draft picks
NJ/NY Gotham FC players
National Women's Soccer League players
People from Mount Laurel, New Jersey
Sportspeople from Burlington County, New Jersey
Women's association football midfielders